Özmen is a Turkish surname. Notable people with the surname include:

 Atilla Özmen (born 1988), Turkish footballer
 Emin Özmen
 Eren Özmen
 Selahattin Özmen
 Şener Özmen
 Sezer Özmen (born 1992), Turkish footballer

Turkish-language surnames